Paula Schramm (born 11 October 1989) is a German actress. She appeared in more than forty films since 1997.

Selected filmography

References

External links 

1989 births
Living people
German film actresses